Varoška Rijeka (Cyrillic: Варошка Ријека) is a village in the municipality of Bužim, Bosnia and Herzegovina.

Demographics 
According to the 2013 census, its population was 5,400.

References

See also
Crvarevac
Bužim
Zborište, municipality of Velika Kladuša

Populated places in Bužim